The 1995–96 2. Bundesliga season was the twenty-second season of the 2. Bundesliga, the second tier of the German football league system.

VfL Bochum, Arminia Bielefeld and MSV Duisburg were promoted to the Bundesliga while Chemnitzer FC, Hannover 96, 1. FC Nürnberg and SG Wattenscheid 09 were relegated to the Regionalliga.

League table
For the 1995–96 season SpVgg Unterhaching, VfB Lübeck, FC Carl Zeiss Jena and Arminia Bielefeld were newly promoted to the 2. Bundesliga from the Regionalliga while VfL Bochum and MSV Duisburg had been relegated to the league from the Bundesliga.

Results

Top scorers
The league's top scorers:

References

External links
 2. Bundesliga 1995/1996 at Weltfussball.de 
 1995–96 2. Bundesliga  kicker.de

1995-96
2
Germany